The Drosophila cardini species group belongs to the subgenus Drosophila of vinegar flies in the Immigrans-tripunctata radiation of the subgenus Drosophila. The closest relatives of Cardini species include Drosophila bizonata, Drosophila quinaria, and Drosophila testacea species groups, comprising mushroom-feeding flies. Cardini group species likely derived their more general feeding ecology from a mushroom-feeding ancestor, an evolutionary transition in feeding similar to Drosophila quinaria.

See also
 Drosophila testacea species group
 Drosophila quinaria species group

References 

cardini species group
Insect species groups